E. armeniaca may refer to:
 Eutypa armeniacae, a grape disease
 Evarcha armeniaca, a spider species in the genus Evarcha

Synonyms
 Eria armeniaca, a synonym for Eria ornata, an orchid species

See also
 Armeniaca (disambiguation)